The following is a list of notable deaths in October 1997.

Entries for each day are listed alphabetically by surname. A typical entry lists information in the following sequence:
 Name, age, country of citizenship at birth, subsequent country of citizenship (if applicable), reason for notability, cause of death (if known), and reference.

October 1997

1
Francisco Aramburu, 75, Brazilian footballer.
Georg Bodenhausen, 92, Dutch civil servant.
Jerome H. Lemelson, 74, American engineer, inventor and patent holder, liver cancer.
Gul Mohammed, 40, Shortest adult human, heart attack.
Inbal Perlmuter, 26, Israeli rock musician, singer, composer and lyricist, car accident.

2
Carybé, 86, Argentine-Brazilian artist, historian and journalist, heart failure.
Douglas Fairbairn, 70, American author.
Esa Seeste, 84, Finnish gymnast.
Guillermo Meza Álvarez, 80, Mexian painter.

3
Michael Adekunle Ajasin, 88, Nigerian politician.
John Ashley, 62, American actor, producer and singer, heart attack.
Walter Baumgartner, 92, Swiss film composer.
Richard Gilkey, 72, American painter, suicide.
Verna Hillie, 83, American film actress, stroke.
Jarl Kulle, 70, Swedish actor and director, bone cancer.
Millard Lampell, 78, American movie and television screenwriter, lung cancer.
Phil Medley, 81, American songwriter.
Charlie Parsley, 71, American basketball player and college coach.
Hadassah Rosensaft, 85, Polish holocaust survivor, liver failure.
A. L. Rowse, 93, British historian and author.
George Urban, 76, Hungarian writer.
Blake Wayne Van Leer, 71, United States Navy officer.

4
Nelson Coral Nye, 90, American author and editor.
Otto Ernst Remer, 85, German Wehrmacht officer during World War II.
Anne Strachan Robertson, 87, Scottish archaeologist, numismatist and writer.
Gunpei Yokoi, 56, Japanese video game designer and creator of the Game Boy, traffic collision.
Georgi Yumatov, 71, Soviet and Russian film actor, aneurysm.

5
Chitta Basu, 70, Indian politician, heart attack.
Mary Jayne Gold, 88, American heiress, pancreatic cancer.
Andrew Keir, 71, Scottish actor (Cleopatra, Rob Roy, Mary, Queen of Scots).
Debbie Linden, 36, British glamour model and actress, heroin overdose.
Dave Marr, 63, American golfer and sportscaster, stomach cancer.
Brian Pillman, 35, American professional wrestler (WCW, WWF, ECW), heart attack.
Tommy Ring, 67, Scottish footballer.
Larisa Rozanova, 78, Soviet and Ukrainian pilot and navigator during World War II.
Curtis Williams Sabrosky, 87, American entomologist.
Arthur Tracy, 98, American vocalist and actor, heart attack.
Bernard Yago, 81, Ivoirian cardinal of the Catholic Church.

6
Orlando Ramón Agosti, 73, Argentine general and part of the military junta, cancer.
George T. Barclay, 87, American football player and coach.
Warren Louis Boudreaux, 79, American prelate of the Roman Catholic Church, heart failure.
Robert Endean, 71, Australian marine scientist.
Adrienne Hill, 60, English actress (Doctor Who), cancer.
Yevgeny Khaldei, 80, Soviet naval officer and photographer.
Johnny Vander Meer, 82, American baseball player, abdominal aneurysm.

7
Felicisimo Ampon, 76, Filipino tennis player.
Johnny Darrell, 57, American country music artist, diabetes.
Wan Laiming, 97, Chinese animator.
Gus Marker, 92, Canadian ice hockey player.
Aldo Sebben, 77, American football, cross country, and track and field coach.
Janez Vrhovec, 76, Yugoslav actor of Slovenian-German origin.

8
Henryk Bista, 63, Polish actor.
Albert Blumberg, 91, American philosopher and political activist.
Bertrand Goldberg, 84, American architect and industrial designer.
Robin Lee, 77, American figure skater.
Brown Meggs, 66, American writer and music executive.
Nininho, 73, Brazilian football player.
Desmond J. Scott, 79, New Zealand flying ace during World War II.
Sant Singh Sekhon, 89, Indian playwright and writer.
George Everard Kidder Smith, 84, American architectural writer and photographer.
William Spong Jr., 77, American politician.

9
Michael Cummings, 78, British newspaper cartoonist.
Monty Hoyt, 53, American figure skater and Olympian, melanoma.
Arch Johnson, 75, American actor, cancer.
Jean Pasqualini, French/Chinese journalist.
Joel Pritchard, 72, American politician, lymphoma.
Roy Rappaport, 71, American anthropologist.

10
D. J. Ambalavanar, 69, Sri Lankan Tamil bishop.
Marjorie Harris Carr, 82, American scientist and environmental activist.
Michael J. S. Dewar, 79, American theoretical chemist.
Hans-Joachim Kasprzik, 69, German film and television director and screenwriter.
George Malcolm, 80, English pianist, harpsichordist, composer, and conductor.
Anne Marriott, 83, Canadian writer, stroke.
Dencio Padilla, 69, Filipino actor and comedian, heart attack.
Walt Simon, 57, American basketball player.
Thomas Whiteside, 79, American journalist, heart failure.

11
Paul Doughty Bartlett, 90, American chemist.
Giacinto Bosco, 92, Italian jurist, academic and politician.
Lina Gennari, 86, Italian actress and operetta singer.
Käthe Gold, 90, Austrian actress.
Will Sherman, 69, American gridiron football player.
Ivan Yarygin, 48, Soviet / Russian heavyweight freestyle wrestler, car crash.

12
Raúl Arellano, 62, Mexican football forward.
John Denver, 53, American singer ("Take Me Home, Country Roads", "Poems, Prayers & Promises", "Annie's Song") and activist, plane crash.
Talib El-Shibib, 63, Iraqi politician.
Draga Garašanin, 76, Serbian archaeologist.
Kenneth Hahn, 77, American civil servant, heart failure.
Fred McCain, 79, Canadian politician.
Isadore Twersky, 67, American orthodox rabbi and professor.

13
Ian Stuart Black, 82, British novelist, playwright and screenwriter.
Joyce Compton, 90, American actress.
Gary Lee Davis, 53, American convicted murderer, execution by lethal injection.
Kārlis Irbītis, 92, Latvian aeroplane designer.
Richard Mason, 78, British novelist, lung cancer.
William Staveley, 68, Royal Navy officer, heart attack.
Adil Çarçani, 75, Albanian politician.

14
Hy Averback, 76, American actor, producer and director.
Piedade Coutinho, 77, Brazilian swimmer and Olympian.
Jacqueline Delubac, 90, French stage and film actress, traffic collision.
George Forrest, 72, British classicist and academic, cancer.
Henry Pelling, 77, British historian.
Harold Robbins, 81, American writer, heart failure.
Barbara Slater, 76, American film actress.

15
MacDonald Critchley, 97, British neurologist.
Peter J. Dalessandro, 79, United States Army soldier and Medal of Honor recipient.
Jack Dwyer, 70, American gridiron football player.
Walter Fritzsch, 76, German football player and manager.
Parker T. Hart, 87, American diplomat.
Bill McKay, 76, Irish rugby player.
John Merricks, 26, English sailor and Olympian, traffic collision.

16
A. H. Armstrong, 88, English educator and author.
Dick Cavalli, 74, American cartoonist, heart attack.
Princess Olga of Greece and Denmark, 94, Greek princess, Alzheimer's disease.
Noel Ferrier, 66, Australian comedian, actor, and theatrical producer.
Lotte Goslar, 90, German-American dancer.
Adam Kennedy, 75, American actor, novelist, and painter, heart attack.
Audra Lindley, 79, American actress (Three's Company, Another World, The Heartbreak Kid), leukemia.
James A. Michener, 90, American author, kidney failure.

17
Larry Jennings, 64, American magician.
Giorgio Pisanò, 73, Italian journalist, essayist and neo-fascist politician.
László Szabados, 86, Hungarian swimmer and Olympic medalist.
Ben Welden, 96, American actor.
Fang Yi, 81, Chinese Communist revolutionary, diplomat, and politician.

18
Leonard Andrzejewski, 73, Polish actor.
Ramiro Castillo, 31, Bolivian footballer, suicide by hanging.
Gordon Clark, 83, English football player.
Walter William Curtis, 84, American prelate of the Roman Catholic Church, pneumonia.
Nancy Dickerson, 70, American radio and television journalist, stroke.
Trude Eipperle, 89, German operatic soprano.
Vince Gironda, 79, American bodybuilder, personal trainer and author.
Roberto Goizueta, 65, Cuban businessman and CEO of The Coca-Cola Company, cancer.
Milt Neil, 83, American animator (Fantasia, Dumbo, The Three Caballeros).
William Rotsler, 71, American artist, cartoonist, pornographer and author.
Paul Edwin Zimmer, 54, American poet and author, heart attack.

19
Donald R. Bensen, 70, American editor and science fiction writer.
Glen Buxton, 49, American guitarist and composer, complications from pneumonia.
Claudia Drake, 79, American actress and singer.
Harold French, 100, English film director, screenwriter and actor.
Arthur Ibbetson, 75, British cinematographer (Willy Wonka & the Chocolate Factory, Where Eagles Dare, The Bounty).
Francisco Guerrero Marín, 46, Spanish composer.
William J. McGill, 75, American psychologist and author.
Pilar Mercedes Miró Romero, 57, Spanish screenwriter and film director, heart attack.
Stella Sierra, 80, Panamanian poet and prose writer.

20
John Jacobs, 50, American student and anti-war activist, complications from melanoma.
Frank Robert Miller, 89, Canadian air chief marshal.
Manush Myftiu, 78, Albanian politician.
Manuel Rodríguez Barros, 71, Spanish racing cyclist.
Li Ruishan, 76, Chinese politician.
Ron Tarr, 60, British actor, cancer.
Henry Vestine, 52, American guitarist, heart and respiratory failure.
Robin Woods, 83, English Anglican bishop.

21
Dolph Camilli, 90, American baseball player.
John Whitney Hall, 81, American Japanologist.
Lorenzo Sumulong, 92, Filipino politician.
Aale Tynni, 84, Finnish poet and translator.
Waldemar F. A. Wendt, 85, United States Navy admiral.
Dick Wilkins, 72, American gridiron football player.

22
Leonid Amalrik, 92, Soviet animator.
Reinhard Lauck, 51, German footballer, traffic collision.
Quentin Smythe, 81, South African sergeant and recipient of the Victoria Cross, cancer.
Valerie Taylor, 84, American author and feminist.
Matthew Trupiano, 58, American mobster, heart attack.

23
Ann Devroy, 49, American political journalist, uterine cancer.
Claire Falkenstein, 89, American visual artist, stomach cancer.
Bert Haanstra, 81, Dutch filmmaker, Alzheimer's disease.
Pinchas Lapide, 74, Israeli theologian and historian.
Kim Lim, 61, Singaporean-British sculptor and printmaker.
Bob Manning, 71, American big band singer, pneumonia.
Michael Peter, 48, Field hockey player from West Germany.
Georges Pianta, 85, French politician .
Babette Rosmond, 75, American author.
Alfredo dos Santos, 77, Brazilian footballer.
Luther George Simjian, 92, Armenian-American inventor and entrepreneur.
Trevor Smith, 87, English footballer and manager.
Gerd Tacke, 91, German businessman and CEO of Siemens.

24
Luis Aguilar, 79, Mexican actor, and singer.
Skip Alexander, 79, American golfer.
Michael Balfour, 79, English actor, cancer.
Don Messick, 71, American voice actor (Scooby-Doo, Where Are You?, The Yogi Bear Show, The Jetsons), stroke.

25
William J. Hirsch, 88, American thoroughbred racehorses trainer, Alzheimer's disease.
Tina Lattanzi, 99, Italian actress and voice actress.
Jamie Livingston, 41, American photographer and film maker, brain tumor.
Mina Rees, 95, American mathematician.

26
Georg Adelly, 78, Swedish film actor.
Teng Haiqing, 88, Chinese military officer and a politician.
William B. Hutchinson, 88, American physician.
Rolf Kukowitsch, 84-85, German football coach.
Donald Ray Matthews, 90, American politician.
Rankin M. Smith, Sr., 72, American businessman and philanthropist.

27
Mahala Andrews, 58, British vertebrae palaeontologist.
Achim Gercke, 95, German Nazi politician.
Billy Neill, 47, Northern Irish football player.
Vladimir Sokoloff, 84, American pianist and accompanist.
Thomas Dale Stewart, 96, American anthropologist.
Reuben Sturman, 73, American businessman and pornographer.
François-Henri de Virieu, 65, French journalist and television presenter, pancreatic cancer.

28
Walter Capps, 63, American politician, heart attack.
Toni Carabillo, 71, American feminist, graphic designer, and historian, lung cancer.
Paul Jarrico, 82, American screenwriter, traffic collision.
Marian E. Koshland, 76, American immunologist, lung cancer.
Bryan Lefley, 49, Canadian ice hockey player (New York Islanders) and coach, car accident.
Klaus Wunderlich, 66, German musician, heart attack.

29
Len Beurton, 83, English communist and Soviet agent.
H. C. Coombs, 91, Australian economist and public servant.
William Crook, 72, American politician and ambassador, congestive heart failure.
Alexander zu Dohna-Schlobitten, 97, German junker, businessman and author.
Paul Guth, 87, French journalist and writer.
Anton LaVey, 67, American author, musician, and occultist, pulmonary edema.
Andreas Gerasimos Michalitsianos, 50, Greek-American astronomer and astrophysicist, brain tumor.
Big Nick Nicholas, 75, American jazz saxophonist and singer, heart failure.
Anthony Velonis, 86, American painter and designer.

30
Jacques Derogy, 72, French journalist, cancer.
Samuel Fuller, 85, American screenwriter, novelist, and film director.
Barney Martin, 74, American baseball player.
Sydney Newman, 80, Canadian film and television producer (The Avengers, Doctor Who), heart attack.

31
Zubeida Agha, 75, Pakistani artist.
Bram Appel, 75, Dutch footballer.
Hans Bauer, 70, German footballer.
Sidney Darlington, 91, American electrical engineer.
Tadeusz Janczar, 71, Polish film actor.
Taisto Kangasniemi, 73, Finnish heavyweight wrestler.
Wilfrid Oulton, 86, British Royal Air Force officer, cancer.
George Roth, 86, American gymnast and Olympic champion.

References 

1997-10
 10